Very Fast Very Dangerous is the second album by British rock band Reuben, released in September 2005. The album was produced by Chris Sheldon at Raezor Studios.

Reception
The album entered #4 in the UK Rock Charts in its first week. It made #87 in the mainstream chart, and one place higher than "Racecar Is Racecar Backwards".

Track listing
 "A Kick in the Mouth" - 3.25
 "Some Mothers Do 'Ave 'Em" - 4.02
 "Best Enemies" - 3.35
 "It's All About Control" - 2.44
 "Every Time a Teenager Listens to Drum and Bass a Rockstar Dies" - 5.11
 "Nobody Loves You" - 4.54
 "Blamethrower" - 3.10
 "Keep It to Yourself" - 2.35
 "Lights Out" - 4.11
 "Alpha Signal Three" (feat. Karl Middleton) - 3.01
 "Good Night" - 3.38
 "Return of the Jedi" - 7.22
 "Boy" - 4.06

Personnel
Jamie Lenman - Guitars, vocals, piano
Jon Pearce - Bass, vocals
Guy Davis - Drums

Singles

Reuben (band) albums
2005 albums
Albums produced by Chris Sheldon
Xtra Mile Recordings albums